Muž Nula (in English transcribed as "Clockwork Men") is a song by Marika Gombitová released on OPUS in 1983.

The title composed by the artist herself, and accompanied with lyrics by Kamil Peteraj, was released as the pilot track to promote the singer's fourth solo studio album Mince na dne fontán. In 1984, its official music video won an Audience Choice award in the Slovak television video chart called 5xP.

Official versions
 "Muž Nula" - Original version, 1983
 "Clockwork Men" - International version, 1983

Credits and personnel
 Marika Gombitová - lead vocal, writer
 Kamil Peteraj - lyrics
 Ladislav Lučenič - bass, acoustic guitar, electric guitar, organ, piano, ARP Oddysey, Minimoog, vocoder, citare, drums, strings
 Dušan Hájek - drums
 Jozef Hanák - harmonique, sound director
 Ján Lauko - producer
 Ján Filo - sound director
 Michal Ivanický - technical coordination
 Igor Adamec - technical coordination

Awards

5xP
5xP, respectively Päť pekných pesničiek pre potešenie was one of the Slovak TV music programs, in which either artists, or upcomers themselves competed by presenting their songs. The show ran from 1983 to 1987, and the others popular (however, with no live audience) were Chose a Song (1967–76), The Ours 9 (1975–79), A Chance for the Talented (1976–83) and 6+1 (1979-83). Gombitová won an Audience Choice award (1984).

References

General

Specific

1983 songs
Marika Gombitová songs
Songs written by Marika Gombitová
Songs written by Kamil Peteraj
Slovak-language songs
English-language Slovak songs